Hackney Wick Stadium was a greyhound racing and speedway stadium located at Waterden Road in the London Borough of Hackney.

Origins
The site chosen for the stadium was on land known as Hackney Marshes west of the River Lea and on the west side of the Waterden Road. The stadium was constructed from September 1931 until 1932 and cost £70,000 to build and after completion £18,000 in wages had been paid to the builders.

Opening
Hackney opened On Friday 8 April 1932 under the affiliation of the British Greyhound Tracks Control Society (BGTCS) the rival to the larger National Greyhound Racing Club. Thirteen thousand people attended the first night and witnessed Marjorie Graves, MP for South Hackney officially open the track. The capacity of the track was put between 30,000 and 50,000 and a totalisator had been installed for the first night. A greyhound called Bullseye became the first ever winner at the track. Although the meeting was advertised as the first official meeting there had been a dress rehearsal two days previously on Wednesday 6 April which attracted 12,000 people.

The company responsible for the project was Hackney Wick Stadium Ltd headed by Managing Director Arthur Gilbert and Racing Manager Fred Whitehead with William Chandler also holding shares in the new company, Chandler would in due course buy the Crooked Billet independent track and turn it into Walthamstow Stadium one year later.

Greyhound racing history

After World War II Hendon Greyhound Stadium and Hackney Wick merged to become the Hackney and Hendon Greyhounds Ltd company. The resident kennels featured six ranges with each able to house up to fifty greyhounds, paddocks sat next to each range with cooking facilities and a veterinary surgeon on site. The kennel fees were 17s 6d for each greyhound.

In the early 1950s Mr S Pay became the Racing Manager after Fred Whitehead was promoted to Director of Racing for both Hackney and Hendon. Pay was later replaced by Hendon Racing Manager D G Lewis before Michael Marksbecame Racing Manager for three decades until the day the stadium closed. The stadium offered eight buffet and licensed bars during racing held on Thursday and Saturday nights at 7.45pm. The circuit had a circumference of 472 yards and the greyhounds raced behind an 'Outside Sumner' hare system. Trainers in the 1960s included Annetts, Reg Bosley, Brown, Colebrooke, Cox, Paddy Gordon, Hedley and Lionel Maxen.

In the 1970s Mr G.Crookbank the track's chief electrician had invented photoelectric timing gear that would revolutionise the sport. Hand timing would become a thing of the past after Crookbank came up with the idea that a greyhound's race time could be recorded electronically. The invention known as 'Automatic Ray Timing' would remain as the timing method until the advent of modern computer timing. The Hackney sales became a major feature of business throughout the year, these sales became a prominent way for buying and selling greyhounds in London.

In 1969 Park Royal Stadium and New Cross Stadium both closed resulting in the Bookmakers Afternoon Greyhound Service (BAGS) being switched to Hendon and Hackney, the racing image of Hackney would change forever as it became the number one BAGS track. Afternoon meetings were introduced and eventually there would be no evening meetings at the track with the Saturday matinee BAGS replacing the Saturday night.

In 1970 businessman George Walker, brother of boxing champion Billy Walker arranged a reverse takeover of Hackney and Hendon Greyhounds Stadium Ltd. This meant his private company bought a public company and the new merger resulted in a new company called Brent Walker. This resulted in the end for the Hendon Greyhound Stadium because it was sold to make way for the UK's first stand-alone shopping centre on the site that would soon be known as the Brent Cross shopping centre.

It was not until the closure of sister track Hendon that Hackney Wick hosted a competition of note. The Guineas long associated with Park Royal had switched to Hendon in 1969 which in turn now found its way to Hackney. Three years later 'The Lead' was introduced and would also become a valuable addition to the calendar. In 1976 local hound Westmead Champ trained by Pam Heasman reached the final of the English Greyhound Derby and was voted Greyhound of the Year.

Hackney fell out with the NGRC in 1987 when the governing body announced that they would charge £300 to a track staging a BAGS meeting covered by Satellite Information Services (S.I.S) plus ten percent of the tracks BAGS fees. Hackney refused and Ladbrokes took legal advice over the situation but all BAGS tracks would eventually pay a fee to the NGRC. Another race called the Lincoln was hosted by Hackney from 1986 and in 1988 Minnies Siren trained by Terry Duggan won the BBC Television Trophy. Brent Walker bought William Hill/Mecca from Grand Metropolitan in 1989 and one year later leading trainer John 'Ginger' McGee Sr. joined the track.

Renovation and closure
During 1991 it transpired that Brent Walker had amassed debts of £1.2 billion, George Walker was removed from the board and the banker took control of the company's assets. With the bank controlling matters there were numerous rumours about the future of the track. By 1994 the stadium had been acquired by a company called London Stadium Hackney Ltd who were in turn owned by Fleetfoot Racing formed in 1992 by ex-Lloyds broker and racing journalist Robert Parker. Work began on an ambitious project including a £12 million restaurant, leading trainers were recruited and the stadium was rebranded 'The London Stadium'.

At the end of 1994 Robert Parker left the company as its director to be replaced by Stephen Rea. Beset with construction problems and internal disagreements the original £14 million scheme to develop the neglected stadium had run into serious problems. Extra cash was raised by rights issues with companies including Rothschild, Henderson Venture Managers and Samuel Montagu. In October 1995 the new stadium was finally ready offering first-class facilities and significantly high prize money. However, on the reopening night and despite a capacity crowd the stadium went into receivership the same evening. Investigations began and banker, Stephen Welton, was pursued by LWT reporter Trevor Phillips and questioned for the Board's failure to conduct due diligence on a prospective buyer who turned out to be an undischarged bankrupt. Parker appeared on Roger Cook's ITV's television program The Cook Report and allegations were also made against Stephen Rea. Fleetfoot Racing Ltd had lasted just three years, with the stadium closing on 4 January 1997.

The stadium was left derelict for several years until it was bought by the London Development Agency and demolished in 2003. The site was the location of the London Olympics Media Centre, the main media and broadcasting centre for the 2012 Summer Olympics and the 2012 Summer Paralympics.

Speedway history 
Hackney Wick Wolves speedway team raced there before World War II . The Hackney Hawks speedway team rode at the venue from 1963 to 1983. Hackney Kestrels speedway team rode here from 1984 until 1990. In 1996, a speedway team under the name of London Lions rode but it was found to be financially unviable. The British Speedway Grand Prix was held at the stadium in 1995 and 1996.

The speedway scenes from the 1933 film Britannia of Billingsgate were shot at the stadium.

See also
Speedway Grand Prix of Great Britain

Competitions

Gymcrack

Guineas

Lead
The track introduced the Lead sponsored by William Hill in 1975; at the same time they switched the 1,000 Guineas to a longer distance of 484 metres. 

1975-1992 (523 metres)

Track Records

Pre Metric records

Post Metric records

External links
Hackney Hawks Website
Aerial view of Hackney Wick Stadium 1938
UK Running Track Directory Details of the history of the track
The Wick was ramshackle, basic beast of a greyhound track ... and all the better for it Article on Betfair.com
Bankrupt on the first night - the desperate story of the 'new' Hackney Wick Article on Betfair.com
Regeneration came five years too late for much-loved Hackney Wick Article on Betfair.com

References 

Defunct greyhound racing venues in the United Kingdom
Sports venues in London
Defunct speedway venues in England
Demolished buildings and structures in London
Former buildings and structures in the London Borough of Hackney
Defunct sports venues in London
Queen Elizabeth Olympic Park
Sports venues completed in 1932
Sports venues demolished in 2003
Defunct greyhound racing venues in London
Demolished sports venues in the United Kingdom
Greyhound racing in London
Hackney Wick